Boyo is a department of Northwest Province in Cameroon. The department covers an area of 1,592 km and as of 2001 had a total population of 169,725. The capital of the department lies at Fundong.

Subdivisions
Boyo Division is divided administratively into 4 subdivisions and in turn into villages. The four subdivisions are

Communes 
 Belo
 Bum
 Fundong
 Njinikom

See also
Communes of Cameroon

References

Departments of Cameroon
Northwest Region (Cameroon)